The Desert Plantation is a Southern plantation with a  historic house located in Pinckneyville, Mississippi in the Tunica Hills.

History
The plantation was established by Robert Semple circa 1808. By 1814, Semple acquired more acres, totalling 1,000 acres. The Pinckneyville Creek flows through the plantation.

The house was built from 1808 to  1812. It was designed in the Federal architectural style. By 1845, Semple added a Greek Revival wing to the original structure.

By 1885, the Semple family sold the plantation to C. H. Norman. Norman in turn sold it to the McGehee and Merwin families, who co-owned an agricultural concern. The house was purchased by D. F. Merwin in 1917, whose family still owned the house by 1987.

Architectural significance
It has been listed on the National Register of Historic Places since April 1, 1987.

References

Plantations in Mississippi
Federal architecture in Mississippi
Houses in Wilkinson County, Mississippi
Houses on the National Register of Historic Places in Mississippi
National Register of Historic Places in Wilkinson County, Mississippi